Dongsheng Subdistrict is a subdistrict of Cangshan District, Fuzhou, Fujian, People's Republic of China, located at the centre of Nantai Island which comprises the district. , it has 4 residential communities under its administration.

See also 
 List of township-level divisions of Fujian

References 

Township-level divisions of Fujian
Subdistricts of the People's Republic of China
Fuzhou